Sokolnik may refer to:
Sokolnik, Warmian-Masurian Voivodeship (north Poland)
Sokolnik, Masovian Voivodeship (east-central Poland)
Sokólnik, Masovian Voivodeship
 Sokolnik, Bulgaria, a village